Tony Garnier (born May 10, 1955) is an American bassist, best known as an accompanist to Bob Dylan, with whom he has played since 1989.

Early life
Garnier was born in Saint Paul, Minnesota on May 10, 1955. His grandfather, D'Jalma "Papa" Garnier, was a New Orleans jazz trumpeter and bandleader. Garnier's brother, also named D'Jalma, is a Creole fiddler. Garnier grew up in southern California.

Career 

Garnier joined Dylan's Never Ending Tour band in 1989, and has sometimes been characterized as his musical director.

In addition to his work with Dylan, Garnier has recorded with such artists as Tom Waits, Loudon Wainwright III, Paul Simon, Marc Ribot, Eric Andersen, Asleep at the Wheel, The Lounge Lizards, Buster Poindexter, and Michelle Branch. Garnier has also played with the Saturday Night Live Band, occasionally substituting for bassist T-Bone Wolk.

References

External links
 Tony Garnier from Bob Dylan Who's Who pages

Living people
American double-bassists
Male double-bassists
Musicians from Saint Paul, Minnesota
Guitarists from Minnesota
Slap bassists (double bass)
Asleep at the Wheel members
20th-century American bass guitarists
21st-century double-bassists
20th-century American male musicians
21st-century American male musicians
1955 births